Euroclydon (or in Latin: Euroaquilo) is a cyclonic tempestuous northeast wind which blows in the Mediterranean, mostly in autumn and winter. It is the modern Gregalia (Gregale) or Levanter.  From the Ancient Greek word eurokludōn [εὐροκλύδων], from Euros (Eurus, meaning east wind) and either the Ancient Greek word akulōn (akylōn, meaning north wind), or kludon (meaning a surging wave from the verb kluzo meaning to billow) or the Latin word aquilō (aquilon). Euroclydon is not to be confused with the term nor'easter, which is a separate storm system that forms in the northeastern portion of the United States.

Notable references 
 In chapter 27 in the Book of Acts 27:14 it may specifically refer to the name of the Gregale wind from the Adriatic Gulf, which wrecked the apostle Paul's ship on the coast of Malta on his way to Rome.
 It is referenced in the second chapter of Moby-Dick.
Euroclydon is also the name of an anthem by William Billings
Referenced in "The Roman Centurion's Song" by Rudyard Kipling: "Here where our stiff-necked British oaks confront Euroclydon!"
Referenced in Henry Wadsworth Longfellow's poem "Midnight Mass for the Dying Year".
Referenced in Dorothy L. Sayers' novel The Nine Tailors  where after a rainstorm, the Rector uses the phrase from Acts 27:14

References

Sources 
 Acts 27:14 http://bible.cc/acts/27-14.htm
 Wiktionary article on Euroclydon
 Moby Dick Chapter 2

Winds
Acts of the Apostles